Guinia may refer to:

Guinia, Niger, a Nigerian village in the municipality of Tanout, Tanout Department
Güinía de Miranda, a Cuban village in the municipality of Manicaragua, Villa Clara Province
Mahmoud Guinia (1951-2015), a Moroccan Gnawa musician, singer and guembri player

See also
Guinea, African country
Guinea (disambiguation)